Bibi Besch (born Bibiana Maria Köchert; February 1, 1942 – September 7, 1996) was an Austrian-American film, television, and stage actress. She is best known for her portrayal of Dr. Carol Marcus in the science fiction film Star Trek II: The Wrath of Khan (1982). Her other notable film roles were in Who's That Girl (1987), Steel Magnolias (1989), and Tremors (1990). Besch also appeared in a number of television productions, including the television film The Day After (1983) and The Jeff Foxworthy Show, and received two Primetime Emmy Award nominations.

Early life
Bibiana Maria Köchert was born in Vienna in 1942, the younger of two daughters born to theater actress Gusti Huber, who starred in German films during World War II, and Gotfrid Köchert, an Austrian racing driver, who served in the Wehrmacht. She had an elder sister, Christiana Barbara Köchert. Gusti and her two daughters remained in Vienna throughout World War II, immigrating to the United States after the war ended. Joseph Besch, a radio executive and former U.S. Army captain, married Huber, a divorcee, in 1946, and became Huber's daughters' stepfather; his stepchildren took his surname. Huber and Besch later had two children, born in the United States, Drea and Andrew, the half-siblings of Bibiana and Christiana. Bibi, her sister and half-siblings, grew up in Chappaqua, New York, where they attended local elementary and junior high schools. She graduated from Horace Greeley High School there in 1959, and attended Connecticut College for Women, but, before graduating, moved to New York City to become an actress. She had a daughter, Samantha Mathis, also an actress.

Career
Most of Besch's early TV experience came from years spent on New York-based daytime soap operas — The Secret Storm (1966), The Edge of Night (1969), Love Is a Many Splendored Thing (1973) and Somerset (1974). In later years she was seen in primetime soaps, such as Secrets of Midland Heights (1980), The Hamptons (1983), Dynasty (1984), Dallas (1985), Falcon Crest (1985-1986), Knots Landing (1989) and an episode of Melrose Place which aired on September 9, 1996, two days after her death.

Besch guest starred in a variety of television series, including Street Hawk, The Rockford Files, The Golden Girls, Murder, She Wrote, Backstairs at the White House, and It's Garry Shandling's Show. Having appeared on a 1979 episode of James Arness' western series, How the West Was Won, she reunited with him in the 1981 made-for-TV film McClain's Law which served as the two-hour debut episode of Arness' 1981–82 same-named police detective series.

She played Dr. Carol Marcus, the early love of Admiral James T. Kirk in Star Trek II: The Wrath of Khan (1982). Her other films included Victory at Entebbe (1976), The Pack (1977), The Promise (1979), Meteor (1979), The Beast Within (1982), The Lonely Lady (1983), The Day After (1983), Mrs. Delafield Wants to Marry (1986), He's My Girl (1987), Who's That Girl (1987), Date with an Angel (1987), Steel Magnolias (1989), Tremors (1990), and Betsy's Wedding (1990).

In 1992, she received an Emmy Award nomination for her performance in Doing Time on Maple Drive, which starred William McNamara and Jim Carrey as her sons. She received another Emmy nomination in 1993 for her recurring-character role as the neurotic mother of Janine Turner's character on Northern Exposure. She continued to act, with 11 television and film credits in 1996, her final year.

Death
Bibi Besch died of breast cancer at Daniel Freeman Hospital in Los Angeles on September 7, 1996. She was 54 years old.

Filmography

Awards and nominations

References

External links

 
 

1942 births
1996 deaths
20th-century American actresses
Actresses from New York (state)
Actresses from Vienna
American film actresses
American soap opera actresses
American television actresses
Austrian emigrants to the United States
Deaths from cancer in California
Deaths from breast cancer
People from Chappaqua, New York